Brown Dog may refer to

 Brown Dog affair, 1900s-decade English vivisection controversy
 NCSA Brown Dog, legacy-data access facility
 A dog with a brown coat of fur

See also 
 Brown Dog Tick